San Antonio de Areco is a partido (county) in the north of Buenos Aires Province, Argentina. 

Districts (localidades)
San Antonio de Areco (capital, or cabecera)
Villa Lía
Vagues
Duggan

References

External links

 

Partidos of Buenos Aires Province
States and territories established in 1730